Matthew Seymour (also Matthew Seamer, and Matthew Seamore) (May 1669 – 1735) was a member of the Connecticut House of Representatives from Norwalk in the sessions of October 1712, and October 1713. He was one of the founding settlers of Ridgefield, Connecticut.

He was the son of Thomas Seamer, the Norwalk settler and Hannah Marvin.

He served as a selectman of Norwalk.

On September 30, 1708, he, along with John Belding, Matthias St. John, and Samuel Keeler entered into an agreement with the native leader Catoonah to purchase the land today known as Ridgefield.

At a Norwalk town meeting in 1718, Matthew, is picked as part of a 6-man committee to represent the town in a major political dispute.

He was named as a lieutenant in 1710, and was named a captain of the North Company of Norwalk on May 26, 1729.

References 

1669 births
1735 deaths
Connecticut city council members
Members of the Connecticut House of Representatives
People from Ridgefield, Connecticut
Politicians from Norwalk, Connecticut
Settlers of Connecticut